Kelly Marcel (born 10 January 1974) is a British screenwriter, actress and television producer. She co-wrote the film Saving Mr. Banks (2013) and wrote the film Fifty Shades of Grey (2015), and created and served as executive producer of the television series Terra Nova.

Biography
Marcel is the daughter of director Terry Marcel and actress Lindsey Brook, and the older sister of actress Rosie Marcel.

Career
Marcel has played minor roles in television series such as The Bill, Holby City, and Casualty. She had a largely non-speaking role as Young Vera in the 1994 television film adaptation of A Dark-Adapted Eye.

Marcel eventually quit acting to pursue writing, while working part-time in Prime Time Video, a video rental shop in Battersea, London. Around the corner from the video shop was the Latchmere pub, where Tom Hardy hosted an acting workshop. Marcel and Hardy became friends, and he subsequently brought Marcel in to do uncredited rewrites on his 2008 film Bronson, directed by Nicolas Winding Refn, after it ran into trouble. One of Hardy's tattoos says 'Skribe' in tribute to Marcel.

While working at the video shop, she wrote a script for a TV show called Gondwanaland Highway. She wrote it for her dad, who had been telling her about the supercontinent Gondwanaland and reading a Stephen Hawking book on time travel. Marcel, who had just seen Al Gore's 2006 global warming documentary An Inconvenient Truth, combined these three influences into the script. Gondwanaland Highway was almost picked up by Carnival Films, the UK production company behind Downton Abbey, when producer Aaron Kaplan persuaded Marcel to bring the show to America instead.

She sold a script about death row, titled Westbridge, to Showtime. She worked on the script with director Thomas Schlamme. Though the script went unmade, it became a calling card for Marcel in Hollywood.

After her two-week trip to Los Angeles and her decision not to continue working on Terra Nova, Marcel returned to the London video shop. She was approached by Ruby Films' Alison Owen to work on a project about Mary Poppins author P. L. Travers and her relationship with Walt Disney for BBC Films, based on an earlier draft by Sue Smith. The script, Saving Mr. Banks, landed on the 2011 Black List, and was acquired by Disney.

The film was released in 2013, directed by John Lee Hancock, and starring Tom Hanks as Walt Disney and Emma Thompson as P. L. Travers. Marcel and Smith shared writing credit. Marcel was nominated for Outstanding Debut by a British Writer, Director or Producer at the 67th Annual BAFTA Awards.

Marcel was hired in 2012 to adapt E. L. James' bestselling erotic novel Fifty Shades of Grey, with Sam Taylor-Johnson directing, after Universal Pictures and Focus Features won the rights to the Fifty Shades trilogy for $5 million in a bidding war. Though the film was financially successful, grossing $571.1 million worldwide on a $40 million budget and spawning two sequels, both Marcel and Johnson expressed unhappiness with the finished film, with Marcel describing it as too painful to watch. Of particular issue was James' insistence that the film preserve her original dialogue in its entirety, and threatening to boycott the film if the dialogue was rewritten.

She was one of the writers on Sony's Venom adaptation, alongside Scott Rosenberg and Jeff Pinkner. Directed by Ruben Fleischer, the film stars Marcel's friend and frequent collaborator Tom Hardy in the title role. She returned to write the script for the sequel. In October 2022, it was announced that Marcel would serve as director for Venom 3 (her directorial debut), in addition to writing and producing it.

Filmography

Script editor
 Bronson (2008)
 The Heavy (2009)

Television

Acting credits

References

External links

1974 births
20th-century British actresses
21st-century British actresses
British film actresses
British television actresses
British television producers
British television writers
British women screenwriters
British women television producers
Living people
Writers from London
British women television writers